Barend Willem Biesheuvel (5 April 1920 – 29 April 2001) was a Dutch politician of the defunct Anti-Revolutionary Party (ARP) now the Christian Democratic Appeal (CDA) party and jurist who served as Prime Minister of the Netherlands from 6 July 1971 until 11 May 1973.

Biesheuvel studied law at the Free University Amsterdam obtaining a Master of Laws degree and worked as a civil servant for the Provincial-executive of North Holland from September 1945 until January 1952 and as trade association executive for the Christian Farmers and Gardeners Association (CBTB) from January 1952 until July 1959 and as chairman from August 1956. Biesheuvel became a Member of the House of Representatives shortly after the number of seats was raised from 100 to 150 seats following the election of 1956 taking office on 6 November 1956 serving as a frontbencher and spokesperson for Agriculture, Local Government Affairs and Kingdom Relations. Biesheuvel was also selected as a Member of the European Parliament and dual served taking office on 7 March 1961. After Party Leader Sieuwert Bruins Slot announced his retirement Biesheuvel served as one of the Lijsttrekkers (top candidates) for the election of 1963 and following the election was selected as Leader and Parliamentary leader on 5 June 1963. Following a cabinet formation Biesheuvel was appointed as Deputy Prime Minister and Minister of Agriculture and Fisheries with the responsibility for Suriname and Netherlands Antilles Affairs in the Cabinet Marijnen taking office on 24 July 1963. The Cabinet Marijnen fell on 27 February 1965 and was replaced by the Cabinet Cals with Biesheuvel continuing his offices. The Cabinet Cals fell on 14 October 1966 and was replaced by the caretaker Cabinet Zijlstra with Biesheuvel again retaining his functions. For the election of 1967 Biesheuvel served as Lijsttrekker  but following a difficult cabinet formation failed to achieve a coalition and returned to the House of Representatives as Parliamentary leader taking office on 23 February 1967. For the election of 1971 Biesheuvel again served as Lijsttrekker and after a successful cabinet formation formed the Cabinet Biesheuvel I and became Prime Minister of the Netherlands taking office on 6 July 1971.

The Cabinet fell on 19 July 1972 just a year into its term and was replaced by the caretaker Cabinet Biesheuvel II with Biesheuvel continuing as Prime Minister. For the election of 1972 Biesheuvel served once again as Lijsttrekker but the following cabinet formation resulted in a coalition led by Labour Leader Joop den Uyl. Biesheuvel left office following the installation of the Cabinet Den Uyl on 11 May 1973 and announced his retirement and stepped down as Leader on 15 May 1973.

Biesheuvel retired from active politics at just 53 and became active in the private and public sectors as a corporate and non-profit director and served on several state commissions and councils on behalf of the government, and continued to be active as a lobbyist for the European Union advocating for more European integration. Biesheuvel was known for his abilities as skillful manager and effective Debater. During his premiership, his cabinets were responsible for several major public sector reforms by stimulating further deregulation and endorsing more privatization. Biesheuvel continued to comment on political affairs as a statesman until his death at the age of 81 from cardiovascular disease. He holds the distinction as leading the last cabinet in which the prime minister was not from the largest party in the coalition, and his premiership is consistently considered both by scholars and the public to have been below average.

Early life

Barend Willem Biesheuvel was born on 5 April 1920 in Haarlemmerliede in the Province of North Holland in a Reformed family, the son of Arie Biesheuvel (born 21 January 1883 in Haarlemmerliede – died 21 May 1952 in Haarlemmerliede) and Johanna Margaretha "Antje" Troost (born 22 February 1881 in Sloten – died 12 December 1955 in Fijnaart). Biesheuvel had three brothers and two sisters. After completing his secondary education at local schools, he graduated in law at the Free University of Amsterdam in September 1945. For the next two years Biesheuvel worked in Alkmaar as secretary to the Food Commissioner for the Province of North Holland. In 1947 he became secretary to the Foreign Division of the Agricultural Society (now the Agricultural Board). In 1952 Biesheuvel became general secretary of the Christian Farmers and Gardeners Association of the Netherlands (CBTB) and in 1959 chairman of that organisation. From the same year he was also a member of the Agricultural Board, the Labour Foundation and the boards of the Centrale Raifeissen Bank and Heidemij.

Politics
Between 1956 and 1963 he represented the Anti-Revolutionary Party in the House of Representatives (the lower house of parliament). From 1957 to 1961 he held a seat on the Consultative Assembly of the Council of Europe and from 1961 to 1963 in the European Parliament.

In the successive administrations headed by Marijnen, Cals and Zijlstra between 24 July 1963 and 5 April 1967 he was Deputy Prime Minister with additional responsibility for matters concerning Suriname and the Netherlands Antilles, and Minister of Agriculture and Fisheries.

In 1967 he returned to the House of Representatives and became leader of the parliamentary Anti-Revolutionary Party. During the same period he also chaired the Shipbuilding Board and the Committee on Government Information Reform.

From 1971 to 1973 Biesheuvel was prime minister of the Netherlands.

After politics
Following his political career, Biesheuvel went on to occupy many other positions in the public and private sectors. Among other things, he was chairman of the supervisory board of the National Investment Bank, a member of the supervisory boards of OGEM and KLM, and chaired the working party on the Netherlands Antilles, the national advisory committee on the relationship between the electorate and policy-making, the Provisional Council for Transport, Public Works and Water Management and the Interministerial Coordinating Committee on North Sea Affairs (ICONA).

Personal life
On 22 November 1945, Biesheuvel married his longtime partner, Wilhelmina Jacoba "Mies" Meuring (born 7 August 1919). They had two daughters and one son. Mies Meuring died on 17 January 1989 at the age of 69. Barend Biesheuvel died in a hospital in Haarlem from cardiovascular disease on 29 April 2001 at the age of 81. Biesheuvel and his wife were buried at the main cemetery in Bloemendaal.

Decorations

References

External links

Official
  Mr. B.W. (Barend) Biesheuvel Parlement & Politiek
  Kabinet-Biesheuvel Rijksoverheid

 
 

 
 

 

1920 births
2001 deaths
Anti-Revolutionary Party MEPs
Anti-Revolutionary Party politicians
Commanders of the Order of the Netherlands Lion
Deaths from cardiovascular disease
Deputy Prime Ministers of the Netherlands
Dutch bankers
Dutch chief executives in the finance industry
Dutch corporate directors
Dutch lobbyists
Dutch nonprofit directors
Dutch nonprofit executives
Dutch officials of the European Union
Dutch trade association executives
European Union lobbyists
Knights Grand Cross of the Order of Orange-Nassau
Leaders of the Anti-Revolutionary Party
Members of the House of Representatives (Netherlands)
Members of the Social and Economic Council
MEPs for the Netherlands 1958–1979
Ministers of Agriculture of the Netherlands
Ministers of General Affairs of the Netherlands
Ministers of Kingdom Relations of the Netherlands
Politicians from Haarlem
People from Haarlemmerliede en Spaarnwoude
Prime Ministers of the Netherlands
Reformed Churches Christians from the Netherlands
Vrije Universiteit Amsterdam alumni
20th-century Dutch businesspeople
20th-century Dutch civil servants
20th-century Dutch jurists
20th-century Dutch politicians